Kolawole is both a surname and a given name. Notable people with the name include:

Antoine Idji Kolawolé (born 1946), Beninese politician
Esther Kolawole (born 2002), Nigerian wrestler
Peter Kolawole (born 1990), Nigerian footballer
Kolawole Agodirin (born 1983), Nigerian footballer
The protagonist of the story "Wintering of Mr. Kolawole" by Oscar Dathorne